John Hays may refer to:

John Hays (businessman) (1949–2020), British businessman, founder of Hays Travel
John Hays (sheriff) (1770 – after 1822), first known Jewish resident of Illinois, Sheriff of St. Clair County, Illinois; Indian agent
John Coffee Hays (1817–1883), or "Jack" Hays, Texas Ranger, U.S. Army officer, first mayor of Oakland, California
John H. Hays (1844–1904), American Civil War recipient of the Medal of Honor

See also
John Hayes (disambiguation)
John Hay (disambiguation)